Somyos Pongsuwan (born 23 September 1993) is a Thai professional footballer who plays as an attacking midfielder for Thai League 2 club Chiangmai.

References

External links

1993 births
Living people
Somyot Pongsuwan
Somyot Pongsuwan
Association football midfielders
Somyot Pongsuwan
Somyot Pongsuwan